A credal set is a set of probability distributions or, more generally, a set of (possibly finitely additive) probability measures.  A credal set is often assumed or constructed to be a   closed convex set.  It is intended to express uncertainty or doubt about the probability model that should be used, or to convey the beliefs of a Bayesian agent about the possible states of the world.

If a credal set  is closed and convex, then, by the Krein–Milman theorem, it can be equivalently described by its extreme points .

If additionally  is also closed and convex, then the lower prevision of a function  of  can be simply evaluated as:

where  denotes a probability mass function.

See also
 Imprecise probability
 Dempster–Shafer theory
 Probability box
 Robust Bayes analysis
 Upper and lower probabilities

References

Further reading

Bayesian inference
Probability bounds analysis